Dawson Trail may prefer to:

Old Dawson Trail, an old land and water route between Ontario and Manitoba
Dawson Trail (electoral district), in Manitoba, Canada